L. maximum  may refer to:
 Leucanthemum maximum, the max chrysanthemum, a flowering plant species native to France and Spain
 Lithophragma maximum, the San Clemente Island woodland star, a rare flowering plant species endemic to San Clemente Island, California

See also
 Maximum (disambiguation)